Candelilla wax is a wax derived from the leaves of the small Candelilla shrub native to northern Mexico and the southwestern United States, Euphorbia antisyphilitica, from the family Euphorbiaceae. It is yellowish-brown, hard, brittle, aromatic, and opaque to translucent.

Composition and production
With a melting point of 68.5–72.5 °C, candelilla wax consists of mainly hydrocarbons (about 50%, chains with 29–33 carbons), esters of higher molecular weight (20–29%), free acids (7–9%), and resins (12–14%, mainly triterpenoid esters). The high hydrocarbon content distinguishes this wax from carnauba wax.  It is insoluble in water, but soluble in many organic solvents such as acetone, chloroform, benzene, and turpentine.

The wax is obtained by boiling the leaves and stems with dilute sulfuric acid, and the resulting "cerote" is skimmed from the surface and further processed. In this way, about 900 tons are produced annually.

Uses 
It is mostly used mixed with other waxes to harden them without raising their melting point.  As a food additive, candelilla wax has the E number E 902 and is used as a glazing agent. It also finds use in the cosmetic industry, as a component of lip balms and lotion bars. One of its major uses is as a binder for chewing gums.

Candelilla wax can be used as a substitute for carnauba wax and beeswax. It is also used for making varnish.

References

External links
 Candelilla wax data sheet - from the UN Food and Agriculture Organization
 Candelilla Institute
 Wax, Men, and Money:  Candelilla Wax Camps along the Rio Grande

Visual arts materials
Food additives
Painting materials
Waxes
E-number additives